Christian Omeruo (born 13 December 1992) is a Nigerian professional footballer who has played for Nigeria Premier League teams and Nigeria U-20.

He is the older brother of professional footballers Kenneth Omeruo and Lucky Omeruo.

Career
Omeruo is a both footed striker and was discovered by Karamone. He started his professional league football debut with COD United F.C. in 2012/13 season, later signed for Sunshine Stars F.C. and played between 2013 and 2015 Nigeria Premier League season due to his great performances for COD United, He signed a year contract with Kwara United F.C.  in the 2015/16 league season. He was invited to the Nigeria U-20 in 2012 and has made 12 caps with 4 goals for the national team in friendly games, championship tournament and qualifier games. He was on the verge of joining some Asian, North Africa and European teams but Sunshine Stars' transfer fee was too high because he was the target striker goalscorer of the team and leading top scorer in the league. He scored braces and lone goal for his teams as one of the brace was against Kano Pillars.

References

External links
 Christian Omeruo Profile

1992 births
Living people
Nigerian footballers
Nigeria Professional Football League players
Association football forwards
Nigerian expatriate footballers
Karamone F.C. players
Expatriate footballers in Nigeria
Sunshine Stars F.C. players
Kwara United F.C. players
Yoruba sportspeople
Sportspeople from Abia State
COD United F.C. players